The 2009 Kentucky Wildcats baseball team represented the University of Kentucky in the sport of baseball during the 2009 college baseball season. The Wildcats competed in Division I of the National Collegiate Athletic Association (NCAA) and the Eastern Division of the Southeastern Conference (SEC). They played their home games at Cliff Hagan Stadium, on the university's Lexington, Kentucky campus. The team was coached by Gary Henderson, who was in his first season at Kentucky.

Roster

Coaches

Players

Schedule/Results 

|- align="center"
| 1 || February 20 || Troy || 8-3 || Myrtle Beach, SC || James Paxton (1-0) || Jason Walls (0-1) || Nick Kennedy (1) || 107 || 1-0 || 0-0 
|- align="center"
| 2 || February 21 || James Madison || 8-3 || Myrtle Beach, SC || Sean Bouthilette (1-0) || Alex Valadja (0-1) || None || 145 || 2-0 || 0-0
|- align="center"
| 3 || February 21 || #22 Coastal Carolina || 1-4 || Myrtle Beach, SC || Austin Fleet (1-0) || Clint Tilford (0-1) || Nick McCully (1) || 936 || 2-1 || 0-0
|- align="center"
| 4 || February 22 || #22 Coastal Carolina || 5-14 || Myrtle Beach, SC || Cody Wheeler (1-0) || Chris Rusin (0-1) || None || 676 || 2-2 || 0-0
|- align="center"
| 5 || February 27 || Western Micgigan || 16-5 || Cliff Hagan Stadium || James Paxton (2-0) || Morrison (0-2) || Alex Meyer (1) || 1539 || 3-2 || 0-0
|- align="center"
| 6 || March 1 || Western Michigan || 15-4 || Cliff Hagan Stadium || Chris Rusin (1-1) || Stroud (0-2) || Braden Kapteyn (1) || 1410 || 4-2 || 0-0
|- align="center"
| 7 || March 3 || Western Michigan || 12-6 || Cliff Hagan Stadium || Logan Darnell (1-0) || Hall (0-1) || None || 1556 || 5-2 || 0-0
|- align="center"
| 8 || March 4 || Eastern Kentucky || 9-8 || Cliff Hagan Stadium || Braden Kapteyn (1-0) || Chris Hord (0-1) || None || 1620 || 6-2 || 0-0
|- align="center"
| 9 || March 6 || Indiana State || 12-4 || Cliff Hagan Stadium ||  ||  ||  ||  || 7-2 || 0-0
|- align="center"
| 10 || March 7 || Indiana State || 5-0 || Cliff Hagan Stadium ||  ||  ||  ||  || 8-2 || 0-0
|- align="center"
| 11 || March 8 || Indiana State || 9-6 || Cliff Hagan Stadium ||  ||  ||  ||  || 9-2 || 0-0
|- align="center"
| 12 || March 10 || Georgetown (KY) || 12-5 || Cliff Hagan Stadium ||  ||  ||  ||  || 10-2 || 0-0
|- align="center"
| 13 || March 11 || Indiana || 8-7 || Cliff Hagan Stadium ||  ||  ||  ||  || 11-2 || 0-0
|- align="center"
| 14 || March 13 || #3 LSU || 3-5 || Alex Box Stadium ||  ||  ||  ||  || 11-3 || 0-1
|- align="center"
| 15 || March 14 || #3 LSU || 1-3 || Alex Box Stadium ||  ||  ||  ||  || 11-4 || 0-2
|- align="center"
| 16 || March 15 || #3 LSU || 5-2 || Alex Box Stadium ||  ||  ||  ||  || 12-4 || 1-2
|- align="center"
| 17 || March 16 || Nicholls State || Cancelled || Thibodeaux, LA ||  ||  ||  ||  ||  || 
|- align="center"
| 19 || March 17 || New Orleans || 5-4 || New Orleans, LA ||  ||  ||  ||  || 13-4 || 1-2
|- align="center"
| 20 || March 20 || Vanderbilt || 3-1 || Cliff Hagan Stadium ||  ||  ||  ||  || 14-4 || 2-2
|- align="center"
| 21 || March 21 || Vanderbilt || 6-2 || Cliff Hagan Stadium ||  ||  ||  ||  || 15-4 || 3-2
|- align="center"
| 22 || March 22 || Vanderbilt || 2-4 || Cliff Hagan Stadium ||  ||  ||  ||  || 15-5 || 3-3
|- align="center"
| 23 || March 24 || West Virginia ||  || Hawley Field ||  ||  ||  ||  ||  || 
|- align="center"
| 24 || March 25 || Cincinnati ||  || Cliff Hagan Stadium ||  ||  ||  ||  ||  || 
|- align="center"
| 25 || March 27 || South Carolina ||  || Cliff Hagan Stadium ||  ||  ||  ||  ||  || 
|- align="center"
| 26 || March 28 || South Carolina ||  || Cliff Hagan Stadium ||  ||  ||  ||  ||  ||
|- align="center"
| 27 || March 29 || South Carolina ||  || Cliff Hagan Stadium ||  ||  ||  ||  ||  ||
|- align="center"
| 28 || March 31 || Marshall ||  || Cliff Hagan Stadium ||  ||  ||  ||  ||  ||
|- align="center"
| 29 || April 3 || Ole Miss ||  || Swayze Field ||  ||  ||  ||  ||  ||
|- align="center"
| 30 || April 4 || Ole Miss ||  || Swayze Field ||  ||  ||  ||  ||  ||
|- align="center"
| 31 || April 5 || Ole Miss ||  || Swayze Field ||  ||  ||  ||  ||  ||
|- align="center"
| 32 || April 7 || Western Kentucky ||  ||  ||  ||  ||  ||  ||  ||
|- align="center"
| 33 || April 8 || Western Kentucky ||  || Cliff Hagan Stadium ||  ||  ||  ||  ||  ||
|- align="center"
| 34 || April 10 || Georgia ||  || Cliff Hagan Stadium ||  ||  ||  ||  ||  ||
|- align="center"
| 35 || April 11 || Georgia ||  || Cliff Hagan Stadium ||  ||  ||  ||  ||  ||
|- align="center"
| 36 || April 12 || Georgia ||  || Cliff Hagan Stadium ||  ||  ||  ||  ||  ||
|- align="center"
| 37 || April 14 || Louisville ||  || Jim Patterson Stadium ||  ||  ||  ||  ||  ||
|- align="center"
| 38 || April 17 || Mississippi State ||  || Dudy Noble Field ||  ||  ||  ||  ||  ||
|- align="center"
| 39 || April 18 || Mississippi State ||  || Dudy Noble Field ||  ||  ||  ||  ||  ||
|- align="center"
| 40 || April 19 || Mississippi State ||  || Dudy Noble Field ||  ||  ||  ||  ||  ||
|- align="center"
| 41 || April 21 || Lipscomb ||  || Cliff Hagan Stadium  ||  ||  ||  ||  ||  ||
|- align="center"
| 42 || April 22 || Evansville ||  || Cliff Hagan Stadium ||  ||  ||  ||  ||  ||
|- align="center"
| 43 || April 24 || Alabama ||  || Sewell-Thomas Stadium ||  ||  ||  ||  ||  ||
|- align="center"
| 44 || April 25 || Alabama ||  || Sewell-Thomas Stadium ||  ||  ||  ||  ||  ||
|- align="center"
| 45 || April 26 || Alabama ||  || Sewell-Thomas Stadium ||  ||  ||  ||  ||  ||
|- align="center"
| 46 || April 28 || Louisville ||  || Cliff Hagan Stadium  ||  ||  ||  ||  ||  ||
|- align="center"
| 47 || May 1 || Tennessee ||  || Cliff Hagan Stadium  ||  ||  ||  ||  ||  ||
|- align="center"
| 48 || May 2 || Tennessee ||  || Cliff Hagan Stadium  ||  ||  ||  ||  ||  ||
|- align="center"
| 49 || May 3 || Tennessee ||  || Cliff Hagan Stadium  ||  ||  ||  ||  ||  ||
|- align="center"
| 50 || May 8 || Auburn ||  || Cliff Hagan Stadium  ||  ||  ||  ||  ||  ||
|- align="center"
| 51 || May 9 || Auburn ||  || Cliff Hagan Stadium  ||  ||  ||  ||  ||  ||
|- align="center"
| 52 || May 10 || Auburn ||  || Cliff Hagan Stadium  ||  ||  ||  ||  ||  ||
|- align="center"
| 53 || May 12 || Morehead State ||  || Cliff Hagan Stadium  ||  ||  ||  ||  ||  ||
|- align="center"
| 54 || May 14 || Florida ||  || Alfred A. McKethan Stadium ||  ||  ||  ||  ||  ||
|- align="center"
| 55 || May 15 || Florida ||  || Alfred A. McKethan Stadium ||  ||  ||  ||  ||  ||
|- align="center"
| 56 || May 16 || Florida ||  || Alfred A. McKethan Stadium ||  ||  ||  ||  ||  ||
|-

|- align="center" 
| 57 ||  ||  ||  || Regions Park ||  ||  ||  ||  ||  || 
|-

|- align="center"
| 58 || June 13 ||  ||  || Rosenblatt Stadium ||  ||  ||  ||  ||  || 
|-

Rankings

References 

Kentucky Wildcats baseball seasons
Kentucky Wildcats
Kentucky Wild